College Field may refer to:

 College Field (Michigan State), the original name for the football stadium used by Michigan State University that is now known as Spartan Stadium
 College Field (North Carolina), a defunct football stadium at Appalachian State University
 College Field (Oregon), the original name of defunct Bell Field at Oregon State University
 College Field, Saint Peter Port, a cricket ground